René Kremer (27 March 1925 – 6 November 2002) was a Luxembourgian athlete and handball player.

He competed in the men's decathlon at the 1948 Summer Olympics. As a handballer, Kremer was known as a member of the Luxembourg men's national handball team, for which he played four times in 1946 and probably later.

References

External links
 

1925 births
2002 deaths
Athletes (track and field) at the 1948 Summer Olympics
Luxembourgian decathletes
Olympic athletes of Luxembourg
People from Schifflange
Luxembourgian handball players